Sidney Waugh (January 17, 1904 – June 30, 1963) was an American sculptor known for his monuments, medals, etched and moulded glass, and architectural sculpture. Waugh was born in Amherst, Massachusetts.  His father, Frank Waugh, was a landscape architect and professor of horticulture and landscape gardening at Massachusetts State College.

Early years
Waugh entered the Massachusetts Institute of Technology at the age of 16 and attended for three years.  This was followed by several years study in Rome and Paris where he studied with Antoine Bourdelle and worked as an assistant to Henri Bouchard.  He was then appointed sculptor for the American Battle Monuments Commission for whom he produced The Spirit of  American Youth and another representing the spirit of peace on the central high pylon at the Florence American Cemetery and Memorial.

In 1929 he won the Prix de Rome where he stayed until 1932. He was commissioned by Steuben Glass in 1934 to prepare for designs for the reinvigorated company under the directorship of Arthur Houghton.

Waugh died in New York City in 1963.

References

1904 births
1963 deaths
20th-century American sculptors
20th-century American male artists
American male sculptors